Naeuiwon() was a palace pharmacy during Joseon dynasty. Literally, it refers to the place located at the palace for medical issues. Its other names were such as Naeguk and Naeyakbang of which terms also designated the place or room for treatment. In Changdeokgung palace, tourists can experience how royal physicians worked long before western modern medicine arrived at Korean peninsula.

History
The first formation of Naeuiwon firstly appeared at the reign of Taejong of Joseon under the title of Naeyakbang - Yak bang means pharmacy room. Later in 1443 during Sejong's era, the title name of Naeuiwon was announced, which implies before 1443, independent organ for medical issues did not exist. The full personnel was 16 people and each personnel was called as Eoui(in Hangul:어의), meaning a royal physician. There were also women doctors who only took care of higher rank women.

After 3 decades passed, Sejo initiated government offices, while the transformation of personnel occurred depending on contemporary situation.

Throughout Joseon, Naeuiwon was the heart of skillful medical affair, affecting tremendous effects of Korean medicine

Administration
Generally speaking, Naeuiwon refers to the place in charge of royal family's health and medical affair.  Additionally, as royal cuisine of Joseon was quite different from normal dining at that time, Eoui also took charge of serving appropriate diet depending on the symptom and preserving materia medica.

See also
 Dongui Bogam
 Heo Jun

References

Note
 Yoon Suk ja, 2009, ≪Interesting food story≫

External links 
 Wikimapia - Naeuiwon
 Naeuiwon

Joseon dynasty
Korean culture
Traditional Korean medicine